Bristol board (also referred to as Bristol paper or super white paper) is an uncoated, machine-finished paperboard. It is not named after the city of Bristol in the southwest of England but rather after Frederick Hervey, 4th Earl of Bristol, a prolific art collector. Bristol board may be rated by the number of plies it contains or, in Europe, by its grammage of 220 to 250 g/m2. It is normally white, but is also made in different colours.

Applications
Bristol paper is used for printing documents, brochures, promotional materials and envelopes. It is often used for water color painting. It is also used for paperback book or catalog covers, file folders, tags, and tickets. Another use is for scale models; some students use this kind of paper for the walls in their scale models. One-ply Bristol is thin enough to be translucent, and two and three ply bristol are the most popular thicknesses.

Bristol board is commonly used for technical drawing, illustration projects, comic book art, and other two-dimensional art forms. It provides two working surfaces, front and back. This quality separates it from illustration board, which has only a front working surface.

The surface texture is either plate or vellum. Plate finish is as smooth as glass, and is very good for pen and ink. Vellum (or kid) finish is a medium texture more appropriate to friction-based media, such as crayon, chalks, or charcoal. A third finish, engravers or wedding, may be used for formal engraved wedding invitations.

References

Visual arts materials
Paper